Zinc finger protein 593 is a protein that in humans is encoded by the ZNF593 gene.

References

Further reading

External links 
 

Transcription factors